Mindy Brashears is the former Under Secretary for Food Safety at the U.S. Department of Agriculture.  She was nominated by President Donald J. Trump and confirmed by a Senate vote on March 23, 2020 and concluded her service on January 20, 2021.  Her responsibilities in this role included leading the nation's Food Safety and Inspection Service (FSIS) and its team of over 10,000 food inspectors and scientists.  She chaired the Codex Alimentarius Policy Committee, which made her the highest-ranking food safety official in the U.S. government during her tenure.

Following her time at USDA, she returned to her role as Professor of Food Microbiology and Food Safety at Texas Tech University where she is the director for the International Center for Food Industry Excellence.

Early life and education
Brashears was born as Mindy Malynn Hardcastle in Wheeler, Texas.  She grew up on a cattle and cotton farm the daughter of Gary and Becky Hardcastle. She graduated from Wheeler High School and went to Texas Tech University in Lubbock, where she majored in Food Technology within the Department of Animal and Food Sciences.  She attended school on scholarship from the Houston Livestock Show and Rodeo. She graduated from Texas Tech in 1992 and then attended graduate school at Oklahoma State University. There, she earned an M.S. (1994) and a Ph.D. (1997) in Food Science with an emphasis in Food Microbiology under the tutelage of Stan Gilliland.

Academic career
Brashears worked at the University of Nebraska as the State Extension Food Safety Specialist from August 1997 until May 2001.  From June 2001 until January 2019 she served as Assistant Professor, Associate Professor and Professor of Food Safety at Texas Tech University.  During her time at Texas Tech, she was also the Director of the International Center for Food Industry Excellence as well as a faculty member for the Center for Biodefense, Law and Public Policy in the Texas Tech School of Law.  She was a prolific researcher and author with over 130 research papers cited over 2,700 times resulting in an index of 37.2 on ResearchGate.

In 2016, she was selected as a Fellow in the National Academy of Inventors.  Her induction ceremony took place on April 6, 2017, as part of the NAI's sixth annual convention at the John F. Kennedy Presidential Library and Museum in Boston.

COVID-19 pandemic actions 
The United States House Select Oversight Subcommittee on the Coronavirus Crisis released a report in May of 2022 detailing the relationship between the Trump administration and the meat packing industry during the COVID-19 pandemic. In the report, Brashear was described as the "go-to fixer" for the meat packing plants. A meat packing lobbyist described a close relationship with Brashear, who was able to prevent local health departments from enforcing COVID-19 safety measures at plants. The report described Brashear providing her personal phone number and email address to industry representatives, in violation of the Federal Records Act.

Public life
In June 2017, Brashears provided expert testimony in the case of Beef Products Inc. (BPI) verses American Broadcasting Companies, Inc., ABC News and other named individuals. BPI's lawyer, Dan Webb contended that ABC's use of the phrase "pink slime" in 2012 made BPI lose customers.  During her testimony regarding the legal definition of "beef" she stated, "Slime is not beef. It does not meet any of the definitions of beef. It is false to call LFTB 'pink slime.' It is not 'pink slime."  ABC and BPI settled the case, reportedly for $177 million.

References

1970 births
Living people
People from Wheeler, Texas
Texas Tech University faculty
University of Nebraska–Lincoln faculty
Texas Tech University alumni
Oklahoma State University alumni
United States Under Secretaries of Agriculture
Fellows of the National Academy of Inventors
Trump administration personnel